Ion Sandu (born 9 March 1993) is a Moldovan footballer who plays as a defender for Moldovan club Codru Lozova.

External links
 
 
 

Living people
1993 births
Moldovan footballers
Footballers from Chișinău
Association football defenders
FC Costuleni players
FC Speranța Crihana Veche players
FC Lokomotíva Košice players
FC Academia Chișinău players
FC Spicul Chișcăreni players
CS Petrocub Hîncești players
FC Codru Lozova players
Moldovan Super Liga players
2. Liga (Slovakia) players
Moldova youth international footballers
Moldova under-21 international footballers
Moldovan expatriate footballers
Expatriate footballers in Slovakia
Moldovan expatriate sportspeople in Slovakia